Dim Qeshlaq-e Olya (also Romanized as Dīm Qeshlāq-e ‘Olyā; also known as Dem, Dem Qeshlāq, and Dīm Qeshlāq) is a village in Qarah Su Rural District of the Central District of Maku County, West Azerbaijan province, Iran. At the 2006 National Census, its population was 1,056 in 196 households, when it was in Chaybasar-e Shomali Rural District. The following census in 2011 counted 1,167 people in 231 households, by which time it was in the recently established Qarah Su Rural District. The latest census in 2016 showed a population of 1,015 people in 233 households; it was the largest village in its rural district.

References 

Maku County

Populated places in West Azerbaijan Province

Populated places in Maku County